An exacerbation, in medicine, is the worsening  of a disease or an increase in its symptoms. Examples includes an acute exacerbation of chronic obstructive pulmonary disease and acute exacerbation of congestive heart failure.

See also
 Flare-up

References

Medical terminology
Symptoms